The Čezeta is a motor scooter originally manufactured from 1957 to 1964 in the Czechoslovak Socialist Republic, (now the Czech Republic), by the Česká zbrojovka Strakonice (ČZ) company, which manufactured motorcycles from 1935 to 1997.

Production resumed in 2017 with the introduction of a limited-edition electric-powered Type 506.

Types 501, 502 and 505 

The original design of the Čezeta is unique amongst scooters. This made the Čezeta ideal for two people and popular with young Czechs and their lovers. The front mudguard is fixed to the body and fully streamlined into the leg shields. The fuel tank is positioned above the front wheel, with the headlight fitted into a recess and a luggage rack on the flat top surface.

The engine was modified for the enclosed scooter by having a drive pulley on the crankshaft driving a fan by means of a Vee belt. There were four foot-operated gears.

The original petrol versions were given type numbers that indicate their features. The first production started with Type 501, then with advancements like a starter motor the Type 502 was later released. The 501 model, built from 1957 to 1959, had the rear wheel supported on one side only and suspended by a rubber block. The later 502 model had a full fork with motorcycle shock absorbers. These types contain sub-types to further indicate their features, for example Type 502/00 is a 12V model with electric starter, and a Type 502/01 is a 6V model with foot-crank starting.

A three-wheeled utility version, the Type 505 (or 'rickshaw'), was built starting in 1960. This vehicle used mechanical components and front bodywork from the 502.

A popular sidecar was also produced, though in limited numbers – approximately 900 in total – by Drupol in Stiřín near Prague. This was sold as the 'Druzeta', the name coming as a combination of the two companies' names.

N-Zeta

In New Zealand a local company, JNZ Manufacturing Ltd assembled the 'Čezeta' under the name 'N-Zeta'. The point of New Zealand production was to avoid the duties placed on imported motor vehicles. Duty could be minimised by assembling locally, and using New Zealand parts wherever possible. The company apparently achieved 25% New Zealand manufacture by value, with tyres, seat, trim, lights, controls etc. and produced 4,000 scooters during the early 1960s.

Type 506

The Czech company Čezeta Motors s.r.o. was launched in 2013 for the development of an electric Čezeta – called the 'Type 506' – by British expat Neil Eamonn Smith. He stated the company's mission was to "build the world's most desirable scooter". 
The Type 506 was developed from 2013-2017. The bike was constructed with a steel and aluminium frame and composite bodyshell to save weight. Local engineering companies and the Czech Technical University in Prague partnered with Čezeta to develop advanced technologies for the throttles, battery, and ECU-CAN system. 
The final production scooter honoured the classic iconic design and sported up to 11kW power and a 8.5kWh Panasonic battery to give it the best speed and range of any A1 scooter in the world.
Pre-orders began in March 2017, the 60th anniversary of Čezeta. On 15 September 2017, the Czech Ministry of Transport confirmed the homologation of the Type 506 as the country's first serial-production electric vehicle. Production began in April 2018 in Prostejov in the historic Wikov factory. It is planned to make 60 of the 'first series' of the Type 506. 
In Summer 2018 the company completed one of the Czech Republic's most successful crowdfunding campaigns, raising 20m Czech Koruna (approx 800,000 euro) in just 10 days. These funds financed the launching of production of the Type 506.
The company planned to start a project to build a second-series Type 506 in 2020-21. Smith states that this will be aimed at a premium mass-market with a price -40% lower than the first-series, and able to compete with Vespa's electric scooter. 
In October 2020, the company was offered for sale. Smith stated he had been convinced by the company's co-owners that it would be in the best interests of the company to sell it to a stronger partner who has the resources to realise its potential.  On 9 February 2021 the company entered insolvency (in accordance with Czech legal requirements) and failing to find a buyer or new funding, the company ended in bankruptcy on 29 July 2022. Smith stated that the company had over 1 million euros of potential orders at the time of its liquidation.  

Smith subsequently has continued with electric motorcyle projects under his DEVS business.

See also
List of motor scooter manufacturers and brands
List of motorcycles by type of engine

References

External links

 čezeta motors s.r.o. company website - www.cezeta.com
 čezeta type 506 review on BBC autos - www.bbc.com/autos/story/20151231-electric-power-for-an-icon-of-the-atomic-age

Motor scooters
Electric motorcycles
Electric scooters
Scooter manufacturers